Rush-Miller House is a historic home located near Smoketown, Berkeley County, West Virginia. It is a two-story, "L"-shaped, stone dwelling with a gable roof.  It is five bays wide and three bays deep.  The rear ell was built about 1810 in the Federal style.  The front two-story section was added about 1873. It is five bays wide and is of pounded rubble limestone in the Romanesque style.  Also on the property is a stone bank barn (1909), stone and frame smoke house, and a stone springhouse.

It was listed on the National Register of Historic Places in 1985.

References

Houses on the National Register of Historic Places in West Virginia
Federal architecture in West Virginia
Romanesque Revival architecture in West Virginia
Houses completed in 1810
Houses in Berkeley County, West Virginia
National Register of Historic Places in Berkeley County, West Virginia